FC Dikhil, more commonly known as Dikhil, is a Djiboutian football club located in Dikhil, Djibouti. It currently plays in the Djibouti Premier League.

Stadium
Currently the team plays at the Stade du Ville, which has a capacity of 20,000.

Current squad

References

External links
Soccerway
Football clubs in Djibouti